92 News (also known as 92 News HD Plus (Channel 92) is a conservative Urdu language TV channel based in Lahore, Pakistan. Mian Muhammad Rasheed is the CEO of the channel.

History
The channel's name, 92, is to celebrate the 1992 Cricket World Cup won by Pakistan. The number 92 is also the telephone country calling code of Pakistan, which is another major reason behind the channel's name.

92 News HD channel was launched in the year 2015.

Network and coverage
It is Pakistan's first HD television news channel. It has reporters in more than 300 cities of Pakistan (self proclaimed).

The company is using Hologram Technology and state of the art technology with video library. The channel has coverage in Pakistan, United Kingdom, and European nations.

Farooq Majeed is the director of News Department at 92 News channel.

Roznama 92 Newspaper
Roznama 92 is published by 92 News.

92 News UK

92 News UK is an Urdu-English language channel. It is Pakistan's first UK television news channel that was launched on Sky Channel 740 on 12 December 2017.

See also
 List of television stations in Pakistan
List of news channels in Pakistan

References

External links
 Official website

2015 establishments in Pakistan
24-hour television news channels in Pakistan
Urdu-language mass media
Urdu-language television channels in the United Kingdom
Television channels and stations established in 2015
Television stations in Lahore
Television stations in Pakistan